Zcash is a cryptocurrency aimed at using cryptography to provide enhanced privacy for its users compared to other cryptocurrencies such as Bitcoin.

Zcash is based on Bitcoin's codebase. It shares many similarities, such as a fixed total supply of 21 million units.

Transactions can be "transparent" and similar to bitcoin transactions in which case they are controlled by a t-addr, or they can be "shielded" and are controlled by a z-addr. A shielded transaction uses a type of zero-knowledge proof called zk-SNARKs, which provides anonymity to the coin holders in the transaction. Zcash coins are either in a transparent pool or a shielded pool. As of December 2017 only around 4% of Zcash coins were in the shielded pool and at that time most cryptocurrency wallet programs did not support z-addrs and no web-based wallets supported them. The shielded pool of Zcash coins were further analyzed for security and it was found that the anonymity set can be shrunk considerably by heuristics-based identifiable patterns of usage.

Zcash affords private transactors the option of "selective disclosure", allowing a user to prove payment for auditing purposes. One such reason is to allow private transactors the choice to comply with anti-money laundering or tax regulations. "Transactions are auditable but disclosure is under the participant's control."  The company has hosted virtual meetings with law enforcement agencies around the U.S. to explain these fundamentals and has gone on the record of saying that "they did not develop the currency to facilitate illegal activity".

While miners receive 80% of a block reward, 20% is given to the "Zcash development fund": 8% to Zcash Open Major Grants, 7% to Electric Coin Co., and 5% to The Zcash Foundation.

History 

Development work on Zcash began in 2013 by Johns Hopkins professor Matthew Green and some of his graduate students. The development was completed by the for-profit Zcash Company, led by Zooko Wilcox, a Colorado-based computer security specialist and cypherpunk. IN October 2016, The Zcash Company raised over $3 million from Silicon Valley venture capitalists to complete the development of Zcash.

Zcash was first mined in late October 2016. The initial demand was high, and within a week Zcash coins were trading for five thousand dollars a piece. Ten percent of all coins mined for the first four years were to be allotted to the Zcash Company, its employees, the investors, and the non-profit Zcash Foundation.

The setup of Zcash required the careful execution of a trusted setup procedure — something that subsequently became known as "The Ceremony" — to create the Zcash private key. In order to ensure the privacy characteristic of Zcash it is important to generate a truly random enormous number that can be used as the private key, while also ensuring that no person or computer retains a copy of the key, or could subsequently regenerate the key. If the private key were available to anyone, they could generate counterfeit Zcash coins, destroying the Zcash system. The Ceremony was a two-day process, executed simultaneously during a short-window of time in six different locations globally, by persons who did not know in advance who else was going to be participating in the event. The private key was generated, and used to instantiate Zcash, and the computers used in the process were reportedly destroyed. The United States' biggest bank, JPMorgan Chase, was also involved in The Ceremony. In 2022, Edward Snowden claimed to have participated in The Ceremony under a pseudonym.

On May 12, 2017, regarding the WannaCry ransomware attack and Zcash's compliance with global anti-money laundering standards, Zooko Wilcox wrote: "I think we can successfully make Zcash too traceable for criminals like WannaCry, but still completely private & fungible. …".

On March 1, 2018, Ariel Gabizon, an employee of the Zcash Company, discovered a critical bug which could have allowed an attacker to create an infinite amount of counterfeit Zcash. Gabizon shared this discovery with only three other employees, including CEO Zooko Wilcox. On October 28, 2018, the fix for this issue was covertly included in the Sapling network upgrade to the Zcash network.

On February 21, 2019, the "Zcash Company" announced a re-branding as the Electric Coin Company (ECC). In their blog post, the company claims that they had been calling themselves the "Zcash Company" but that their legal name has always been the Zerocoin Electric Coin Company, LLC and that they will now be known as the ECC.

On September 24, 2019, the ECC announced that Zcash was compliant with all requirements arising from the Financial Action Task Force (FATF) anti-money-laundering recommendations in a company blog post titled "How Zcash is Compliant with the FATF Recommendations". ECC's blog post claims that their virtual asset is more compliant than most other virtual assets as they implement the "Travel Rule" requirement.

On May 19, 2020, a paper titled "Alt-Coin Traceability" investigated the privacy of both Zcash and Monero. This paper concluded that "more academic research is needed in Zcash overall" and that the privacy guarantees of Zcash are "questionable". The paper claimed that since the current heuristics from a 2018 Usenix Security Symposium paper entitled "An Empirical Analysis of Anonymity in Zcash" still continue today that the result is making Zcash less anonymous and more traceable.

On June 8, 2020, Chainalysis added support for Zcash to their Chainalysis Reactor and "Know Your Transaction" (KYT) technologies. This permits Chainalysis to trace and provide transaction values and at least the sender or receiver address for over 99% of Zcash activity. Chainalysis explains that it is able to accomplish this since most Zcash users do not use privacy-enhancing features. Chainalysis also cites a research paper by the RAND corporation which revealed that less than 0.2% of the cryptocurrency addresses on the dark web were Zcash addresses.

On October 12, 2020, the ECC announced a new non-profit 501(c)3 organization called the Bootstrap Project (Bootstrap) in a company blog post titled "ECC’s owners to donate ECC". A majority of the investors and owners of Zerocoin Electric Coin Company LLC (ECC) have agreed to donate the ECC company as the wholly owned property of Bootstrap. ECC's blog post claims that nothing will change within the company other than the ownership including the Board of Directors. On October 27, 2020, ECC announced that its shareholders have officially voted in favor of donating 100 percent of the company's shares to Bootstrap.

On March 30, 2021, the ECC published the "ECC Transparency Report for Q3 2020". In this report, the ECC reports that it is "now a wholly owned entity of the 501(c)3 Bootstrap".

See also 
 Legality of bitcoin by country
 Zerocoin protocol
 zk-SNARKs

References

External links
 

Cryptocurrency projects
Application layer protocols
Software using the MIT license
Cryptography
Private currencies
Computer-related introductions in 2016